This uniform polyhedron compound is a chiral symmetric arrangement of 10 triangular prisms, aligned with the axes of three-fold rotational symmetry of an icosahedron.

Related polyhedra 

This compound shares its vertex arrangement with three uniform polyhedra as follows:

References 
.

Polyhedral compounds